Rachael Lillis (born July 8) is an American voice actress and scriptwriter. She studied acting in Boston and New York City and has appeared in various theater productions, animated series and independent films.

She was formerly based in New York City, but has since moved to Los Angeles in 2013.

Filmography

Voice roles

Film

Anime

Animation

Video games

Audiobooks

Production credits

Script adaptation

Translator

References

External links
 
 Rachael Lillis at the CrystalAcids Anime Voice Actor Database
 Rachael Lillis at Live Oak Media audiobooks
 

20th-century American actresses
20th-century American women writers
21st-century American actresses
21st-century American women writers
Actresses from Dallas
Actresses from Los Angeles
American film actresses
American television actresses
American television writers
American video game actresses
American voice actresses
American women screenwriters
Living people
American women television writers
Writers from Dallas
Writers from Los Angeles
Screenwriters from California
Screenwriters from Texas
Year of birth missing (living people)